Poshtkuh Rural District may refer to:

Poshtkuh Rural District (Dashtestan County), Bushehr province
Poshtkuh Rural District (Ardal County), Chaharmahal and Bakhtiari province
Poshtkuh Rural District (Lordegan County), Chaharmahal and Bakhtiari province
Poshtkuh Rural District (Isfahan Province)
Poshtkuh Rural District (Mazandaran Province)
Poshtkuh Rural District (Semnan Province)
Poshtkuh Rural District (Sistan and Baluchestan Province)
Poshtkuh Rural District (Firuzkuh County), Tehran province

See also
Poshtkuh-e Mugui Rural District, in Isfahan province